A general election was held in the U.S. state of Wyoming on Tuesday, November 3, 1970. All of the state's executive officers—the Governor, Secretary of State, Auditor, Treasurer, and Superintendent of Public Instruction—were up for election. Continuing their success from 1962 and 1966, Republicans won all of the statewide executive offices once again, and all of them by large margins.

Governor

Incumbent Republican Governor Stanley Hathaway ran for re-election to a second term. He was opposed by State Representative John J. Rooney, the Democratic nominee. Hathaway defeated Rooney in a landslide.

Secretary of State
Incumbent Republican Secretary of State Thyra Thomson ran for re-election to a third term. After facing marginal opposition in the Republican primary, Thomson faced former State Representative Howard L. Burke, the Democratic nominee, in the general election. Continuing her streak of winning large majorities, Thomson defeated Burke in a landslide to win re-election.

Democratic primary

Candidates
 Howard L. Burke, former State Representative from Laramie County, 1966 Democratic candidate for Governor

Results

Republican primary

Candidates
 Thyra Thomson, incumbent Secretary of State
 Bob Craver

Results

General election

Results

Auditor
Incumbent Republican State Auditor Everett T. Copenhaver ran for re-election to a second consecutive term, his fourth term as State Auditor overall. The Democratic Party did not embark on a major recruitment effort for the race, and the primary election boiled down to Mike Vinich, who served as the executive director of the state employment security commission, rancher David Laird, and businessman Frank Woodhouse. The primary election was close, with Vinich holding a several-hundred vote lead over Laird as the votes were tallied. However, Laird declined to seek a recount and conceded to Vinich, who advanced to the general election against Copenhaver. The general election was much less close, and Copenhaver handily defeated Vinich to win re-election.

Democratic primary

Candidates
 Mike Vinich, former Executive Director of the Wyoming Employment Security Commission
 David G. Laird, Worland rancher
 Frank Woodhouse, Cheyenne businessman

Results

Republican primary

Candidates
 Everett T. Copenhaver, incumbent State Auditor

Results

General election

Results

Treasurer
Incumbent Republican State Treasurer Minnie A. Mitchell was unable to seek re-election to a second consecutive term, creating an open seat. Newspaper publisher Jim Griffith won the Republican primary over Cheyenne Mayor Floyd Holland, and he proceeded to the general election, where he was opposed by Democratic nominee Bob Adams, a former State Representative who had repeatedly run as the Democratic nominee for Auditor or Treasurer for several decades. Griffith ultimately defeated Adams by a wide margin.

Democratic primary

Candidates
 Bob Adams, former State Representative, former State Representative from Laramie County, 1966 Democratic nominee for Treasurer, 1962 Democratic nominee for Treasurer, 1958 Democratic nominee for State Auditor, 1954 Democratic nominee for State Auditor
 Elizabeth Phelan, State Representative from Laramie County

Results

Republican primary

Candidates
 Jim Griffith, publisher of the Lusk Herald
 Floyd Holland, Mayor of Cheyenne

Results

General election

Results

Superintendent of Public Instruction
Incumbent Republican Superintendent of Public Instruction Harry Roberts declined to seek a second term, instead opting to run forCongress rather than seek re-election. Robert G. Schrader, the superintendent of schools in the city of Cody, won a crowded Republican primary to succeed Roberts. He faced Democratic nominee Patrick J. Moran, the Superintendent of the Johnson County School District No. 1, in the general election. Schrader defeated Moran by a wide margin, significantly improving from Roberts's 1966.

Democratic primary

Candidates
 Patrick J. Moran, Superintendent of the Johnson County School District No. 1

Results

Republican primary

Candidates
 Robert G. Schrader, Superintendent of Cody Schools
 Jim Durkee, University of Wyoming vocational education professor
 Richard Langdon, Superintendent of Goshen Hole schools
 Ned N. Tranal, Sheridan psychologist

Results

General election

Results

References

 
Wyoming